Moara Dracului may refer to the following places in Romania:

 Moara Dracului, tributary of the Drăgan in Bihor County
 Moara Dracului Gorge, in Suceava County

See also 
 Moara (disambiguation)